John DeMita is an American actor. He is married to Julia Fletcher. He is most recognized as the voice of Dosu Kinuta, Hiashi Hyuga and Hizashi Hyuga on the hit anime series Naruto. In addition to his many film roles, he is also notable for his recurring role as Colonel Clifford Blakely, a judge on the U.S. military drama JAG. His teaching credits include College of the Canyons in Santa Clarita, California, El Camino College in Torrance, California and the University of Southern California in Los Angeles, California. He was educated at Yale University. DeMita is represented by Chrome Artists Management, in Los Angeles.

Dubbing roles

Anime 

 Biohunter – Additional voices
 Bleach – Bulbous G
 Code Geass – Joseph Fennette (Ep. 13), Minister of Domestic Affairs (Ep. 5, 12, 22)
 Demon Slayer: Kimetsu no Yaiba - Jigoro Kuwajima
 Dragon Ball Super – Beerus (Bang Zoom! Dub, credited as Archie Fletcher)
 Final Fantasy: Legend of the Crystals – Valkus
 Ghost in the Shell: SAC_2045 – Iino
 Hunter × Hunter 2011 series – Satotz (as Will Barret from Ep. 13 onwards)
 Hurricane Polymar – Joe Kuruma
 JoJo's Bizarre Adventure – Kars
 Magical Girl Pretty Sammy – Biff Standard (Ep. 2)
 Marmalade Boy – Youji Matsura 
 Mobile Suit Gundam: Iron-Blooded Orphans – Coral Conrad
 Naruto – Dosu Kinuta, Hiashi Hyuga, Hizashi Hyuga, Kagari
 Naruto Shippuden – Kazuma/Furido, Hiashi Hyuga, Hizashi Hyuga, Sakumo Hatake
 Ninja Scroll TV – Roga, Kawahori, Yamikubo
 One-Punch Man – Silver Fang
 Pet Shop of Horrors – Count D
 Psycho Diver – Kuroiwa
 Reign: The Conqueror – Alexander, Cleitus, Hephaestion
 Sword Gai - Kigetsu
 Tekkaman Blade II – D-Boy
 Tenchi Muyo! Ryo-Ohki – Seiryo (OVA 2, Original)
 Twilight of the Dark Master – Huang Long
 Wild 7 – Kuromatsu
 Yashahime: Princess Half-Demon – Yotsume

Film 

 The Animatrix – Teacher (Kid's Story)
 Black Mask – Michael, Simon, Tsui Chik, Black Mask (English dub)
 Fist of Legend – Chen Zhen (English dub)
 The Bodyguard from Beijing – John Chang (English dub)
 Final Fantasy: The Spirits Within – BCR Soldier, Space Station Technician
 Gen¹³ – Stephen Callahan
 Kiki's Delivery Service – Additional Voices (Disney dub)
 Kingsglaive: Final Fantasy XV – Clarus Amicitia
 Laputa: Castle in the Sky – Additional Voices (Disney dub)
 Lilo & Stitch – Additional Voices
 Mobile Suit Gundam Thunderbolt: December Sky – J.J. Sexton
 NiNoKuni – Old Man (Netflix dub)
 Princess Mononoke – Kohroku
 Resident Evil: Vendetta – Glenn Arias
 Tenchi Muyo! in Love – Sabato
 Vampire Hunter D: Bloodlust – Alan Elbourne, Priest

Video games 

 AI: The Somnium Files – Nirvana Initiative – So Sejima
 Binary Domain – Cain, Major Philips
 Demon Slayer: Kimetsu no Yaiba – The Hinokami Chronicles – Zenitsu's Master
 Eraser – Turnabout – Harry Reese
 Final Fantasy X – Luzzu
 Final Fantasy X-2 – Barkeep
 Final Fantasy XII – Additional Voices
 Final Fantasy XV: Episode Ardyn - Clarus Amicitia
 One-Punch Man: A Hero Nobody Knows - Silverfang
 Valkyria Chronicles – Kreis Czherny
 Vampire Hunter D – D, Grove
 AI: The Somnium Files – So Sejima

Filmography

Live action roles

Television

 18 Wheels of Justice – Deputy Director John Keane
 Brotherly Love – Greg Anderson
 Child of Darkness, Child of Light – Vatican priest
 Conan the Adventurer – Ursath
 CSI: Crime Scene Investigation – Jason Garbett
 Down the Shore – Elliot
 Freddy's Nightmares – Tom
 Hooperman
 Hunter – Young Agent
 I Know My First Name Is Steven – Dan Smith
 Inherit the Wind – Harry Y. Esterbrook
 JAG – Col. Clifford Blakely
 Knots Landing – Eric Thomas
 L.A. Law – Jerry McVey
 Life of the Party: The Pamela Harriman Story – Peter Duchin
 Matlock – Hornsby
 Ned and Stacey – Bob
 Once and Again – Caller
 Party of Five – Sales Clerk
 Perry Mason: The Case of the Lethal Lesson – Scott McDonald
 Reign: The Conqueror – Cleitus, Haphaestion
 Remington Steele – Carl
 Santa Barbara – Arthur Newton
 Spawn – Additional Voices
 Silk Stalkings – Quinn
 Sliders – Dr. Steven Jensen
 Star Trek: The Next Generation – Taul
 The Facts of Life – Mr. Horn
 The Jackie Thomas Show – Sam #2
 The Pursuit of Happiness
 The Twilight Zone – George
 Tour of Duty – Lt. Henry Driscoll

Film

 Jackie Chan's Project A – Tze
 Josh Kirby... Time Warrior: Chapter 2, the Human Pets – William of Dearborn
 Josh Kirby... Time Warrior: Chapter 1, Planet of the Dino-Knights – William of Dearborn
 Leprechaun 3 – Fazio
 Megiddo: The Omega Code 2 – Chuck Farrell
 Spellbinder – Brad
 Steel and Lace – Agent Spoon
 The Opposite Sex and How to Live with Them – Chipper
 Thru the Moebius Strip – Guard
 Universal Soldier – TV News Crew
 Waking Up in Reno – Additional Voices
 Without Warning – Major Powers

References

External links
 
 

1959 births
Living people
American male film actors
American male stage actors
American male television actors
American male video game actors
American male voice actors
Place of birth missing (living people)
El Camino College faculty
Male actors from California
20th-century American male actors
21st-century American male actors